Chatham station is a train station in Chatham, Ontario, Canada, served by Via Rail trains running between Toronto and Windsor. The station is wheelchair accessible.

The Canadian National Railways/VIA Rail Station at Chatham is a one-and-a-half-storey, brick railway station, built in 1879. It is located in a mixed commercial area, south of the city centre of Chatham-Kent . The formal recognition is confined to the railway station building itself.

See also

 List of designated heritage railway stations of Canada

External links
Via Rail Canada page for Chatham train station

Via Rail stations in Ontario
Railway stations in Chatham-Kent
Great Western Railway (Ontario)
Canadian National Railway stations in Ontario
Grand Trunk Railway stations in Ontario
Designated heritage railway stations in Ontario